The Battle of Guté  Dili was fought on 14 October 1888 between an alliance of the Shewan forces of Ras Gobana Dacche and Mahdist forces under governor Khalil al-Khuzani near Nejo in the modern Mirab Welega Zone of the Oromia Region, Ethiopia. The Mahdist forces were routed, and only Khalil and Muhammad Hassan of Fadasi, who was leading the Bela Shangul contingent, with a small group of Ansar and Berta soldiers, were able to successfully flee the battlefield.

This engagement represents the high water mark of Mahdist activity in what is now southwestern Ethiopia. Despite raids over the next two years, local rulers west of Lega Naqamte, such as 'Abd ar-Rahman Khojali of Qabesh, stopped paying tribute to Omdurman (the Mahdist capital) and ignored summons to present themselves there. Further, Ras Gobana's master, (then) king Menelik II of Shewa was able to continue extending his influence into the area south of the Abay River, which followed Menelik and Gobena's defeat of the Gojjame army six years earlier in the Battle of Embabo.

References 

1888 in Ethiopia
1888 in Sudan
Battles involving Ethiopia
Menelik's Expansion Campaigns
Battles of the Mahdist War
Battles involving Sudan
Conflicts in 1888
October 1888 events